Jutta Richter (born 30 September 1955 in Burgsteinfurt, Westfalen, Germany) is a German author of children's and youth literature.

Richter spent her youth in the Ruhr and Sauerland and at the age of 15 she spent a year in Detroit (USA). There she wrote her first book, so as not to forget her native language, and published the book whilst still a schoolgirl.

After studying Theology, German and Communication in Münster she has worked since 1978 as a freelance writer at Schloss Westerwinkel in Ascheberg and in Lucca (Tuscany).

Jutta Richter married the German author Ralf Thenior.

Awards 

 2000 "Rattenfänger-Literaturpreis" for Der Hund mit dem gelben Herzen oder Die Geschichte vom Gegenteil
 2000 "LUCHS des Jahres" for Der Tag, als ich lernte die Spinnen zu zähmen
 2001 "Internationaler UNESCO-Preis" Nomination for Der Hund mit dem gelben Herzen
 2001 Deutscher Jugendliteraturpreis for Der Tag, als ich lernte die Spinnen zu zähmen
 2004 "LUCHS" book of the month August for Hechtsommer
 2004 "LesePeter" Septembre for Hechtsommer
 2005 "Katholischer Kinder- und Jugendbuchpreis" for Hechtsommer
 2006 Deutschlandfunk – "Die besten 7 Bücher für junge Leser" in November 2006 for Die Katze oder Wie ich die Ewigkeit verloren habe
 2007 "Premio Andersen" (Italian children's literature award) for Die Katze oder Wie ich die Ewigkeit verloren habe
 2008 Mildred L. Batchelder Award for Die Katze oder Wie ich die Ewigkeit verloren habe

Bibliography 

 Popcorn und Sternenbanner. Diary of a student exchange, 1975
 Die Puppenmütter, 1980
 Das Geraniengefängnis, 1980
 Die heilste Welt der Welt. Ein Jahr im Leben der Familie Feuerstein, 1984
 Gib mir einen Kuß, Frau Nuß!, 1984
 Was machen wir jetzt? Oder die seltsamen Abenteuer der gelben Kanalratte und des karierten Meerschweinchens, 1985
 Himmel, Hölle, Fegefeuer. Versuch einer Befreiung, 1985
 Das Tontilon, 1986
 Und jeden Samstag baden. Geschichten von früher, 1987
 Prinz Neumann oder Andere Kinder heißen wie ihr Vater, 1987
 Satemin Seidenfuß. Eine Liebesgeschichte, 1988
 Annabella Klimperauge. Geschichten aus dem Kinderzimmer. Carl Hanser Verlag, 1989
 Annabelle la rebelle. La Joie de lire, 2004
 Der Sommer schmeckt wie Himbeereis. Gedichte und Reime für Große und Kleine, 1990
 Hexenwald und Zaubersocken, 1993
 Der Hund mit dem gelben Herzen oder Die Geschichte vom Gegenteil, 1998
 Le chien au coeur jaune. La Joie de lire, 2000
 Il cane dal cuore giallo o la storia dei contrari. Beisler edizione, 2003
 Herr Oska und das Zirr, 1998
 Es lebte ein Kind auf den Bäumen, 1999
 In der allerlängsten Nacht, 1999
 Verlass mich nicht zur Kirschenzeit. Liebesgedichte, 2000
 Der Tag, als ich lernte die Spinnen zu zähmen. Carl Hanser Verlag, 2000
 Ce jour-là j'ai apprivoisé les araignées. La Joie de lire, 2002
 Quando imparai ad addomesticare i ragni. Salani, 2003
 Hinter dem Bahnhof liegt das Meer. Carl Hanser Verlag, 2001
 Derrière la gare, il y à la mer. La Joie de lire, 2003
 Tutti i sogni portano al mare. Beisler edizione, 2004
 An einem großen stillen See, 2003
 Un soir, près d'un lac tranquille. La Joie de lire, 2004
 Hechtsommer, Carl Hanser Verlag, 2004
 L'été du brochet. La Joie de lire, 2006
 The summer of the pike. Milkweed Editions, 2006
 Un'estate di quelle che non finiscono mai. Salani, 2006
 Die Katze oder Wie ich die Ewigkeit verloren habe, 2006
 Il gatto Venerdì. Beisler edizione, 2006
 The Cat Or How I lost eternity. Milkweed Editions, 2007
 Sommer und Bär. Eine Liebesgeschichte, 2006
 All das wünsch ich dir, 2007
 Der Anfang von allem. Carl Hanser Verlag, 2008

Literature 

 Bruno Blume: Erinnerungen an eine verlorene Kindheit. Versuch einer umfassenden Rezension. In:  Bulletin Jugend und Literatur. Geesthacht, 32, H. 2, 2001, p. 21
 Christoph Meckel: Plagiat oder Lärm um nichts? Die Debatte um Jutta Richters "Hinter dem Bahnhof liegt das Meer". Eine Dokumentation. In: Bulletin Jugend und Literatur. Geesthacht, 33, H. 3, 2002. p. 7-9, 29-30.
 Juliane Schier: Jutta Richter. Kinder- und Jugendbuchautorin. Leben und Werke. Dortmund: Univ. Hausarb. 1999.

External links 
 
 Official website by Jutta Richter
 Jutta Richter in: NRW Literatur im Netz 

German children's writers
German women children's writers
20th-century German women writers
21st-century German women writers
1955 births
Living people